Grunde Njøs (born 20 June 1967) is a Norwegian speed skater, born in Trondheim. He competed in the 500 m and 1,000 m at the 1994, 1998 and 2002 Winter Olympics.

He was Norwegian champion in sprint in 1992, and again in 1999, and won the Norwegian championships in 500 meters (single distance) five times between 1996 and 2003.

References

External links 
 

1967 births
Living people
Sportspeople from Trondheim
Norwegian male speed skaters
Olympic speed skaters of Norway
Speed skaters at the 1994 Winter Olympics
Speed skaters at the 1998 Winter Olympics
Speed skaters at the 2002 Winter Olympics